Stephen Jones is a Welsh journalist and the rugby correspondent for The Sunday Times since the 1970s. He covers rugby for The Times as well. He also contributes an occasional report on others sports like cricket, football, and golf, in addition to his main topic of rugby.

In 2019, he was on the first panel to determine the World Rugby women's-15s player-of-the-year award with Melodie Robinson, Danielle Waterman, Will Greenwood, Liza Burgess, Lynne Cantwell, Fiona Coghlan, Gaëlle Mignot, Jillion Potter, and Karl Te Nana.

References

Welsh journalists
Living people
People educated at Bassaleg School
Year of birth missing (living people)